Birchgrove is a district of the city of Cardiff stretching between Llanishen and the  Gabalfa interchange, along the A469 Caerphilly road.

It centres on a crossroads dominated by the Birchgrove pub which also lies between Heath and Whitchurch. Heath Park and University Hospital of Wales adjoin.

It differentiates from the ward of Heath  in which it lies, by being a busy, hustle and bustle type of area,  with rows of small shops and eateries and for the most part being dominated by 
Terraced housing.

The area is served by Birchgrove railway station on the Coryton Line, and by the Capital City Green bus service.

Notable people
Colin Jackson (1967-) Former hurdler and presenter, grew up on Coronation Road in Birchgrove, attending Birchgrove Primary School.
Geraint Thomas, Winner of the Tour de France 2018. Grew up on Cromwell Road in Birchgrove.

References

External links 
www.geograph.co.uk : photos of Birchgrove and surrounding area

Districts of Cardiff